Kollar is a surname of German origin. Kollár is the Slavic and Hungarian variant. The name may refer to:

Adam František Kollár (1718–1783), Slovak historian
Andrej Kollár (born 1977), Slovak ice hockey manager
Bill Kollar (born 1952), American football coach
Boris Kollár (born 1965), Slovak politician, MP(2016-), speaker of the National Council(2020-)
Colleen Kollar-Kotelly (born 1943), American judge
David Kollar (born 1983), Slovak musician
Dmitrij Kollars (born 1999), German chess grandmaster
Helmut Kollars (born 1968), Austrian illustrator
Igor Kollár (born 1965), Slovak athlete
Ján Kollár (1793–1852), Slovak writer
János Kollár (born 1956), Hungarian mathematician
Laszlo Peter Kollar (1926–2000), Australian architect 
Martin Kollar (born 1971), Slovak photographer
Miroslav Kollár (born 1969), Slovak politician, MP(2020-)
Péter Kollár (1855–1908), Slovene writer
Pina Kollars (born 1970), Austrian singer
Sebastian Kollar (born 1987), Swiss football player
Tomas Kollar (born 1982), Swedish ice hockey player
Vincenz Kollar (1797–1860), Austrian entomologist

See also
Kohler
Kolář
Kolar

Slavic-language surnames
Hungarian-language surnames
German-language surnames